Cromarty Firth is one of the 21 wards used to elect members of the Highland Council. It consists of North of the Cromarty Firth, west of the Tain and Easter Ross ward
Includes the towns of Alness, Evanton and Invergordon.  It elects four Councillors.

Councillors

Election Results

2022 Election
2022 Highland Council election

2017 Election
2017 Highland Council election

2012 Election
2012 Highland Council election

2007 Election
2007 Highland Council election

References

Highland council wards
Alness
Invergordon